Joseph Schmid (born 11 September 1934) is a Swiss wrestler. He competed in the men's Greco-Roman featherweight at the 1960 Summer Olympics.

References

External links
 

1934 births
Living people
Swiss male sport wrestlers
Olympic wrestlers of Switzerland
Wrestlers at the 1960 Summer Olympics
Sportspeople from the canton of Bern